Edge of the Sun is the eighth studio album by indie rock band Calexico. It was released in April 2015 on Anti-.

Accolades

Track listing

Personnel
Calexico
Ryan Alfred – upright and electric bass, synth, ambient guitar, vocals
Joey Burns – vocals, guitars, banjo, piano, organ, harmonica, cello, congas, accordion, shaker, ukulele, bass
John Convertino – drums, percussion
Sergio Mendoza – mellotron strings, percussion, piano, organ, backing vocals, vibes, guitar, vihuela, accordion, ukulele
Paul Niehaus – pedal steel
Jacob Valenzuela – trumpet
Martin Wenk – trumpet, synth, vibes
Jairo Zavala – guitar, bass

Additional musicians
Sam Beam – vocals on "Bullets and Rocks"
Ben Bridwell – vocals on "Falling from the Sky"
Pieta Brown – vocals on "When The Angels Played"
Neko Case – vocals on "Tapping on the Line"
Tom Hagerman – strings on "Miles from the Sea" and "Coyoacan"
Steff Koeppen – additional vocals on "Tapping on the Line"
Thomas Konstantinou of Takim – lute and bouzouki on "World Undone"
Greg Leisz – pedal steel on "When The Angels Played", guitar on "Woodshed Waltz"
Yorgos Marinakis of Takim - traditional violin on "World Undone"
Gaby Moreno – vocals on "Miles from the Sea" and "Beneath the City of Dreams"
Carla Morrison – vocals on "Moon Never Rises"
Adrian Perez – jalisco harp on "Bullets and Rocks" and "Coyoacan"
Antonio Pro – guitarron on "Coyoacan"
Isaac Rodriguez – additional vocals on "Cumbia de Donde"
Amparo Sánchez – vocals on "Cumbia de Donde"
Chris Schultz – percussion on "Falling from the Sky", additional vocals on "Cumbia de Donde"
Craig Schumacher – moog bass on "World Undone"
Nick Urata – vocals on "Follow the River"

Charts

References

External links
 

2015 albums
Calexico (band) albums
Anti- (record label) albums